Senzoku-ike No.2 Dam  is an earthfill dam located in Hiroshima Prefecture in Japan. The dam is used for irrigation. The catchment area of the dam is 2 km2. The dam impounds about 2  ha of land when full and can store 125 thousand cubic meters of water. The construction of the dam was started on 1947 and completed in 1965.

References

Dams in Hiroshima Prefecture